is a Japanese professional golfer.

Kataoka plays on the Asian Tour and the Japan Golf Tour. On the Asian Tour, he has three top-10 finishes including a trio of third places: 2011 Mercuries Taiwan Masters, 2013 CIMB Niaga Indonesian Masters, and 2013 Queen's Cup. On the Japan Golf Tour, he won the 2015 Kansai Open Golf Championship, the 2016 Top Cup Tokai Classic and the 2017 Asia-Pacific Diamond Cup Golf.

Professional wins (4)

Japan Golf Tour wins (3)

1Co-sanctioned by the Asian Tour

Japan Golf Tour playoff record (0–1)

Asian Tour wins (1)

1Co-sanctioned by the Japan Golf Tour

Other wins (1)
2007 Chushikoku Open (as an amateur)

Results in World Golf Championships

"T" = Tied

References

External links

Japanese male golfers
Japan Golf Tour golfers
Asian Tour golfers
Sportspeople from Kōchi Prefecture
1988 births
Living people